The Oratory of Saint Stephen is a Roman Catholic chapel in Mocchirolo in the town of Lentate sul Seveso, part of the Province of Monza and Brianza, Lombardy, northern Italy.

The interior walls of the church once contained frescos that were removed and transferred to be housed the Pinacoteca di Brera in Milan. The frescos currently appear in apse are the reproduction of the original.

External links

Romanesque architecture in Lombardy
14th-century Roman Catholic church buildings in Italy
Lentate sul Seveso